Radomyśl nad Sanem  (until 2001 Radomyśl) is a village in Stalowa Wola County, Subcarpathian Voivodeship, in south-eastern Poland. It is the seat of the gmina (administrative district) called Gmina Radomyśl nad Sanem. The village has a population of 893. Radomyśl was a town from 1558 to 1935.

In the early days of Polish statehood, the area of Radomyśl belonged to the Duchy of Sandomierz, which later became Sandomierz Voivodeship. In 1474, Lublin Voivodeship was created out of its eastern part, and Radomyśl belonged to this province until 1772 (see Partitions of Poland), when it was annexed by Austria, together with whole Galicia. Radomyśl nad Sanem itself was founded as a private village in 1556, by a local nobleman Jakub Sienienski. Two years later, King Zygmunt August granted it a town charter (Magdeburg rights), and in 1584, King Stefan Batory gave permission for an annual fair and weekly markets, organized on each Monday. In the Second Polish Republic, Radomyśl nad Sanem belonged to Lwow Voivodeship, and in 1935 it lost its town charter, after almost 400 years.

References

Villages in Stalowa Wola County
1556 establishments in Europe
16th-century establishments in Poland